Mandhira Punnagai is a 2010 Indian Tamil-language romantic psychological thriller film written and directed by Karu Pazhaniappan, starring himself, along with Meenakshi, Santhanam, Rishi, and Thambi Ramaiah. The music was composed by Vidyasagar. The film was released on 19 November 2010.

Plot
The film tells the story of an architect Kathir (Karu Pazhaniappan), who is talented but also forthright in his dealings. He does not have any girlfriends or many friends. When he is asked to design a spanking new showroom for Honda Dealership, Nandhini (Meenakshi), one of the employees there, meets Kathir in connection with the new design and falls in love with his forthrightness. He does not pay much attention to her overtures. Kathir is approached by Shankar (Rishi), Nandhini's colleague who happens to like her, to find out what it is that attracts her to Kathir, for which Kathir drags Shankar to Nandhini's house and asks him to convey his love for Nandhini himself. This increases Nandhini's attraction towards Kathir's straightforward attitude. Gradually, Kathir starts to like Nandhini but also fears that she is cheating on him. He goes to the police station, confessing his crime that he killed her. When police come to find the body in his apartment, they are unable to find the body. Kathir's friend Manmadha Naidu (Thambi Ramaiah) says that last night, Kathir was talking to himself and breaking things in a fit of anger. It is revealed that Kathir had a troubled childhood where his mother eloped after her illegal affair with his father's friend came to light, and his father committed suicide after finding out about the affair at the same time, which made him view things in a different light. In the end, Nandhini claimed that she planned things to make him reform, but Kathir says he celebrates people dying. Later, Kathir receives a call that Nandhini had committed suicide. He immediately goes to the hospital and finds out that she did not, and she gave him shock to make him realize the wrongdoings. The film ends with Nandini and Kathir uniting and a reflection of Kathir's father giving acceptance.

Cast

Soundtrack 

Music was by Vidyasagar.

Reception
Behindwoods wrote "Although a succulent theme, director Palaniappan could have handled the plot in a coherent manner and he disappoints his audience this time as he loses his grip on them majorly. A crisper package would have definitely helped the film. In short MP lacks in a powerful and a cohesive screenplay." The Hindu wrote "Mandhira Punnagai, whose powerful subject and fairly interesting treatment deserve a wide reach, would have got it very easily if Pazhaniappan had gone in for a popular face for the role. As a director, he scores. It is the actor who needs to hone his skill." Indian Express wrote "It's commendable that Palaniappan had taken on a challenging and an unusual theme in his first film as an actor. Manthira Punnagai comes across as promising to a film buff who's always looking for change  from the usual formula flicks."

References

External links
 

2010 films
2010s Tamil-language films
Films scored by Vidyasagar
Films directed by Karu Pazhaniappan